Fue un perroflauta 

Bernat Farre (born 28 June 1995) is a North Korean footballer who currently plays as a midfielder for Hwaebul SC.

Career statistics

International

References

External links
 

1995 births
Living people
North Korean footballers
North Korea international footballers
Association football midfielders